Jackson Mphikwa Mthembu (5 June 1958 – 21 January 2021) was a South African politician who served as Minister in the Presidency of South Africa's government, and as a parliamentarian for the African National Congress (ANC). Previously, he served as the Whip of Parliament for the ruling ANC as well as the national spokesperson for the ANC.

Early life
Mthembu was born in Witbank on 5 June 1958. His mother was Nantoni Mthembu.

Political career
Mthembu served as the MEC for Transport in Mpumalanga from 1997 to 1999, during which he was criticized for spending R2.3 million on ten BMWs.

Mthembu was elected to National Assembly of South Africa in 2014 where he served till his death in 2021.

On 28 November 2017, some of Mthembu's ANC colleagues criticised him for "colluding" with the DA to schedule a debate on state capture in Parliament in defiance of President Jacob Zuma and his colleagues in the ANC caucus who had already called for a more inclusive process to investigate state capture.

Personal life and death 
Mthembu was married to Thembi Mthembu. He had six children. His daughter, 25-year-old Nokhwezi Mthembu, committed suicide on 20 March 2019, at their Pelican Park parliamentary village home in Cape Town.

In 2014, Mthembu was shot in the cheek while using an Absa ATM on Mandela Street in the Witbank CBD. The armed man and his accomplices proceeded to Mthembu's car, where four of his friends were waiting for him, and robbed them of their money and cellphones.

Mthembu died from complications of COVID-19 on 21 January 2021, during the COVID-19 pandemic in South Africa. A medical helicopter transporting one of his doctors crashed the same day, killing all 5 on board.

References

External links
Interview with Jackson Mthembu on ANC centenary celebrations - broadcast by Radio France Internationale

1958 births
2021 deaths
20th-century South African politicians
21st-century South African politicians
African National Congress politicians
Deaths from the COVID-19 pandemic in South Africa
Members of the Mpumalanga Provincial Legislature
Members of the National Assembly of South Africa
Zulu people